Nanissio Soares (born 17 September 1991), better known as Nani, is a Bissau-Guinean footballer who plays for Olympiakos Nicosia as a midfielder.

International career
Nani was called up to the Guinea Bissau national football team for 2017 Africa Cup of Nations qualification matches against Kenya in March 2016.

References

External links

1991 births
Living people
Sportspeople from Bissau
Bissau-Guinean footballers
Guinea-Bissau international footballers
Liga Portugal 2 players
Olympiakos Nicosia players
Bissau-Guinean expatriate footballers
Bissau-Guinean expatriate sportspeople in Portugal
Expatriate footballers in Portugal
Bissau-Guinean expatriate sportspeople in Cyprus
Expatriate footballers in Cyprus
2017 Africa Cup of Nations players
Association football midfielders